Brett Wood (born 31 March 1980) is an Australian musician based in Melbourne.

Early life
Wood attended Montmorency Secondary College and grew up in the north/eastern suburb of Greensborough. At the age of 14 Wood began teaching himself guitar and soon came to the attention of well known guitar legend Tommy Emmanuel CGP who took Wood to America to play at the 1994(?) Chet Atkins Appreciation Society Convention. Wood had the honour of meeting and playing for Chet Atkins and was asked to return to the convention the following year to perform at the convention. Wood won the Young Guitarist of the Year Award at the Frankston International Guitar Festival.

2000
At the age of 20 Wood released his first solo instrumental album "Turn It Up..." and completed a promo tour for this album across Australia. The album was reviewed by Australian Guitar Magazine as "sheer guitar wizardry". Before he turned 21 Wood had toured with Tommy Emmanuel, Keith Urban, Dianna Corcoran, Harper, and Australian country acts including Carter & Carter, Mike Carr and Brendon Walmsley. Wood is now an endorser of Fender Guitars and Amplifiers. Wood has recorded on many Australian albums and has appeared on well known TV shows including: Good Morning Australia, Dancing with the Stars, Today, The Footy Show (AFL & NRL), and Rove.

2009
In 2009 Wood co-wrote "Outta Here" with Australian vocalist Michelle Berner who won the Vega 30+ Suburban Superstar competition. The song was recorded at Chong Lim's (John Farnham's Musical Director) studio and was added to the Vega play list gaining much praise and support from fans and music industry professionals. Wood was the Lead Guitarist for Australian Singer/Songwriter Pete Murray and toured both with the full band and also as an acoustic duo with Pete across Australia, Europe and the UK.

2010
Wood accompanied Pete Murray to Los Angeles where they recorded original Blue Sky Blue release (not the Byron Sessions version). There they recorded at Sunset Sound with legendary producer Tom Rothrock known for his involvement with the Foo Fighters, Beck, Elliott Smith and James Blunt. Wood performed guitar on all tracks and also co-wrote two songs that made the final cut, "Tattoo Stained" and "Hold It All For Love".

2011
In 2011 Wood played guitar on several tracks on the album Falling & Flying by Melbourne hip hop artist 360, including the singles Child, Boys Like You, Killer, and Run Alone.

2012
After years of working alongside Pete Murray, and after a tour of Europe and Australia to support the album "Blue Sky Blue", Wood resigned from his position in the band to pursue other opportunities. He joined Melbourne based hard/classic rock band Electric Mary to tour Australia, Japan, Europe and the UK. The tour was titled 'Back in the EU-UK'.

References

External links
 https://web.archive.org/web/20090914025553/http://www.petemurray.com/newsEvents/home.do
 
 https://web.archive.org/web/20110714084807/http://michelleberner.com/News_and_Events.html
 http://www.perthnow.com.au/news/hard-body-soft.../story-0-1111117131861
 https://web.archive.org/web/20110716140033/http://stevenjaymes.com/PDF/Lyrics-%20Things%20Get%20Better.pdf
 https://web.archive.org/web/20091013152427/http://australianmusician.com.au/DisplayStory.asp?StoryID=65
 https://web.archive.org/web/20091212060733/http://www.fasterlouder.com.au/reviews/events/17691/Clipsal-500-After-Race-Concert--Friday.htm
 https://web.archive.org/web/20100524030139/http://blues.co.nz/news/article.php?id=338
 https://web.archive.org/web/20090416175457/http://www.premonition.com.au/clients/andrew/about.htm
 https://web.archive.org/web/20091003122844/http://www.muster.com.au/newsletter/update_news161205/tsasongwritersnews.html
 http://www.guitarheroes.com.au/bretwood.htm

1980 births
Living people
21st-century Australian musicians
Australian guitarists
21st-century guitarists
People from Greensborough, Victoria
Musicians from Melbourne